The Aiplspitz is a 1,759 meter high mountain in the Rotwand group east of the Spitzingsee in the Bavarian Prealps, Germany.

Mountains of Bavaria
Bavarian Prealps
Mountains of the Alps